Lake of the Woods 34 is a First Nations reserve on Lake of the Woods. It is one of the reserves of the Animakee Wa Zhing 37 First Nation.

References

External links
 Canada Lands Survey System

Anishinaabe reserves in Ontario
Communities in Rainy River District